Teletruth is an early United States television series. It is notable as an early example of a television game show for kids, though it was not a network series. It aired on New York City station WNBT from 1945 to either 1946 or 1947. It was originally hosted by Pat Barnes. Jay Marshall later took over the hosting job.

Reception
The October 20, 1945 edition of Billboard magazine gave the series a mixed review, saying of the series "Tele-truth, despite its corny name, is the first video quiz this department has seen so far which was 100 per cent visual and perhaps 85 per cent entertaining", but also said that "Teletruth could be improved considerably if a few things were done to it".

Episode status
Practical/viable methods to record live television did not exist during the run of the series. As such, it is most likely lost today, except possibly for still photographs.

References

1945 American television series debuts
1946 American television series endings
1947 American television series endings
Black-and-white American television shows
English-language television shows
Lost American television shows
1940s American game shows
Local game shows in the United States